Paracosmus is a genus of bee flies in the family Bombyliidae. There are about five described species in Paracosmus.

Species
These five species belong to the genus Paracosmus:
 Paracosmus edwardsii (Loew, 1872) i c g b
 Paracosmus insolens Coquillett, 1891 i c g b
 Paracosmus morrisoni Osten Sacken, 1887 i c g b
 Paracosmus rubicundus Melander, 1950 i c g b
 Paracosmus similis Hall, 1957 i c g
Data sources: i = ITIS, c = Catalogue of Life, g = GBIF, b = Bugguide.net

References

Further reading

 

Bombyliidae
Articles created by Qbugbot
Bombyliidae genera